Joey Dekkers (born 3 October 1989) is a Dutch footballer who plays as a midfielder for Tweede Divisie club De Treffers.

Club career
Dekkers moved into professional football relatively late at 25 years, after joining Achilles '29 in 2015 from amateur side EVV. Before that, the left-sided midfielder played for SVC 2000 and Sportclub Irene.

He made his professional debut in the Eerste Divisie for Achilles '29 on 7 August 2015 in a game against Jong Ajax and scored a winning goal in a 2–1 victory for Achilles. In 2017, he suffered relegation with Achilles '29 from the Eerste Divisie, after which he returned to EVV in the Derde Divisie. In 2018, he returned to Achilles '29, at that time also competing in the Derde Divisie. After Achilles '29 suffered another relegation, Dekkers moved to fellow Groesbeek club De Treffers in June 2019, playing in the third-tier Tweede Divisie.

References

External links
 Profile - Voetbal International
 
 

1989 births
Living people
People from Tegelen
Association football midfielders
Dutch footballers
RKVV EVV players
Achilles '29 players
Eerste Divisie players
De Treffers players
Tweede Divisie players
Derde Divisie players
Footballers from Limburg (Netherlands)